Lily Mariye (born September 25, 1964) is an American television director, filmmaker and actress.

Early life
Mariye was born in Las Vegas, Nevada and graduated from UCLA with a BA in theater arts.

Career
From 1994 to 2009 she had a regular role as nurse Lily Jarvik on the NBC television series ER. She has appeared in many films such as The Best Little Whorehouse in Texas, Mighty Joe Young, The Shadow, The New Age, The Doctor and Extraordinary Measures. Mariye has guest-starred in over 25 television shows including Teen Wolf, Criminal Minds, Shameless, NCIS L.A., Judging Amy, Ally McBeal, Family Ties, Star Trek: Deep Space Nine and Chicago Hope. She is also an award-winning theatre actress, performing in New York, Los Angeles and other regional theatres around the country.

Mariye's debut feature film as a writer and director, Model Minority had its world premiere at the 2012 Los Angeles Asian Pacific Film Festival, where it received three awards: Special Jury Outstanding Director, Breakthrough Performance by a New Actor and Outstanding Cinematography as well as being a nominee for the Grand Jury Prize in Narrative Feature Filmmaking. Model Minority also won Best Micro-Budget Film and Best Female Director at The London Independent Film Festival, and Outstanding Feature at The Sacramento International Film Festival.

She has written several full-length screenplays, one of which, The Shangri-la Cafe, was accepted into the second round of the application process for development in the Sundance Feature Film Labs. The Shangri-la Cafe won Best Screenplay at the Ohio International Independent Film Festival and the Gaffers Film Festival, and won her a grant from the AFI Conservatory's prestigious Directing Workshop for Women, 13th Cycle. While at AFI she produced and directed an award-winning short film version of the script (Best Short Film Award - Moondance International Film Festival, Best Screenplay Award - Brussels Independent Film Festival). The short film version of The Shangri-la Cafe was included on a DVD release of AFI shorts entitled Celebrating AFI.

In 2012 Mariye was chosen to participate in the Disney/ABC/DGA Directing Program.

In 2016 she directed Episode 14, Season 4 of ABC's Nashville and Episode 4 after Nashville (season 5) moved to CMT.
She also directed an episode of Season 2 of Amazon's Just Add Magic and episode 17, Season 4 of Freeform's The Fosters.

In 2017 she participated in The CBS Directing Initiative.

Also in 2017, Mariye directed episodes of Chicago P.D., NCIS: Los Angeles and helmed her third episode on Nashville (season 6).

In 2018 Mariye directed two episodes of CBS's Criminal Minds, Chicago P.D., NCIS: Los Angeles, MacGyver and The Enemy Within.

In 2018 she received a DGA Award Nomination at the 70th Annual DGA Awards for Outstanding Directorial Achievement in Children’s Program for her work on Just Add Magic.

Mariye also received the Visionary Award from East West Players in April 2018 for her contributions in raising "the visibility of the Asian Pacific American (APA) community through [her] craft."

Personal life
A resident of Los Angeles, Mariye lives with her husband, saxophonist Boney James.

Directing credits

Acting credits

Film

Television

Theatre

References

External links

 

1964 births
Actresses from Las Vegas
American film producers
American film directors of Japanese descent
Living people
American film directors
American women film directors
UCLA Film School alumni
American actresses of Japanese descent
American television directors
American women television directors
20th-century American actresses
21st-century American actresses
American women film producers